Nordic combined at the 2006 Winter Olympics, consisted of three events held over ten days, from 11 February to 21 February. The events took place in Pragelato.

Medal summary

Medal table

Events

Participating NOCs
Fifteen nations contributed nordic combinators to the events at Torino.

References

 
2006 in Nordic combined
2006 Winter Olympics events
2006
Nordic combined competitions in Italy
Men's events at the 2006 Winter Olympics